Esmeralda Island (Spanish: Isla Esmeralda) is an island in the Patagonian Archipelago in Magallanes y la Antártica Chilena Region, Chile.

See also
 Juan Guillermos Island also known as Esmeralda Island.

Islands of Magallanes Region